Britannic means 'of Britain' or 'British', from the Roman name for the British.

Britannic may also refer to:

Arts and entertainment 
 Britannic (film), a 2000 film based on the story of HMHS Britannic
 SS Britannic, a fictional ocean liner in the 1974 movie Juggernaut

Ships 
 , owned by the White Star Line and third sister ship of RMS Olympic and RMS Titanic, sank in 1916 after hitting a naval mine
 , a motor liner owned by the White Star Line and then Cunard Line, scrapped in 1960
 , holder of the Blue Riband, owned by the White Star Line

Other uses 
 Britannic (typeface), a sans-serif typeface sold by Stephenson Blake

See also
 Britannia (disambiguation)
 Britannica (disambiguation)
 Britannicus (41–55 AD)